Debney is a surname. Notable people with the surname include:

George Debney (1818–1897), English emigrant to Australia and cabinetmaker
John Debney (1956–), American film composer and conductor
P. James Debney, CEO and President of American Outdoor Brands Corporation

English-language surnames